ETC Crimmitschau, also known as Eispiraten Crimmitschau, is an ice hockey team in Crimmitschau, Germany. They currently play in DEL2, the second level of ice hockey in Germany. Prior to the 2013–14 season they played in the 2nd Bundesliga league.

The club was founded in 1990. They were promoted to the 2nd Bundesliga in 2000.

Season records

Tournament results

Achievements
Oberliga champion : 1995, 2000.

Current roster

References

External links
  eispiraten-crimmitschau.de - Eispiraten Crimmitschau official website
  etconline.de - Eispiraten Crimmitschau fanpage

Ice hockey teams in Germany
Ice hockey clubs established in 1990
Sport in Saxony
Crimmitschau
1990 establishments in Germany